Donovan van den Heever (born 22 February 1981) is a South African chess player. He became an International Master in 2014, won the South African Chess Championship in the same year and has represented South Africa at the Chess Olympiad, including 2006, 2010, 2014, 2016 and 2018.

References

1981 births
South African chess players
Chess International Masters
Living people
Chess Olympiad competitors
Place of birth missing (living people)